The Helvetiaplatz in Zürich is located in the District 4 (ger.: Kreis 4) at the corner Langstrasse and Stauffacherstrasse.

The first project of pastor Ernst Sieber's Sozialwerke Pfarrer Sieber for homeless people started at Helvetiaplatz in winter 1963; the foundation is still based in Zürich-Aussersihl. The place is well known because of the demonstrations on 1 May and against the World Economic Forum. Otherwise peaceful and multicultural events or demonstrations take place there. In the years 2006 and 2007 there was a great champion celebration after the FCZ (one of Zurichs Soccer Teams) won the Swiss Axpo Super League. Every Tuesday and Friday from 6 to 11 o'clock you can find a market with a wide range of food products.

Directly at the Helvetiaplatz you can find the Volkshaus where there are regular events such as concerts or parties. Next to the Helvetiaplatz is the Kanzleiareal with a schoolhouse, the cultural centre called Kanzlei and the alternative Cinema and Bar named Xenix.

Events
Langstrassenfest
The Langstrassenfest (eng.: Longstreet Festival) is an important part of the Langstrasse PLUS campaign.  It takes place since 1996 every two years and counts in 2004 about 270,000 visitors. In the years without a Langstrassenfest, the Longstreet Carneval takes place. The Langstrassenfest is organised by Swiss citizens.

Longstreet Carneval
If there is no Langstrassenfest, the Longstreet Carneval takes place. This carnival is organised by non–Swiss citizens.

Caliente
The Caliente Festival is the biggest Latin Festival all over Europe. It counts over 130,000 visitors in the year 2006.

Open-Air-Cinema
Every summer in July and August there is an open air cinema at the cinema/bar Xenix near the Helvetiaplatz.

District 4 of Zürich